Exame
is a fortnightly magazine specializing in economics, business, politics and technology published by Editora Abril, in São Paulo, Brazil. It reports news, reviews and tips about business, sales, investments, economics, environment, technology and marketing.

Launched in 1967, it is the leading business magazine in Brazil. Exame has a circulation of about 200.000 copies with 160,000 subscribers. 70 journalists, designers, revisers and photographers work for the paper. Its headquarters is located in São Paulo with offices in Rio de Janeiro, Brasília and New York City.

A publication with same title and masthead is published under licence of Editora Abril in Angola. Business magazines with the same title exist also in Portugal, there published by Impresa in Lisbon, and in Mozambique.

Recent circulation history

References

External links 
  Official website Exame Brazil

1967 establishments in Brazil
Magazines published in Brazil
Business magazines
Biweekly magazines
Grupo Abril
Magazines established in 1967
Mass media in São Paulo
Portuguese-language magazines